Moradabad (also Romanized as Morādābād) is a village in Qaleh Ganj Rural District, in the Central District of Qaleh Ganj County, Kerman Province, Iran. At the 2006 census, its population was 30, in 9 families.

References 

Populated places in Qaleh Ganj County